Staccioli is an Italian surname. Notable people with the surname include:

Giulia Staccioli (born 1964), Italian rhythmic gymnast
Ivano Staccioli (1927–1995), Italian actor
Mauro Staccioli (1937–2018), Italian sculptor

Italian-language surnames